Hum Log is a 1951 Indian Hindi social realist film written and directed by Zia Sarhadi. Dealing with the trials and tribulations of a middle-class family, the film stars Nutan, Shyama, Durga Khote, Balraj Sahni and Sajjan in lead roles. Nutan earned positive notice for her portrayal of a tuberculosis patient and so did Sahni who played her brother. The film was a commercial success and established Nutan as a rising star in the film industry.

Cast
The cast is as follows:
 Nutan as Paro
 Shyama as Shepali
 Durga Khote as Mother
 Balraj Sahni as Raj
 Sajjan as Anand
 Anwar Hussain as Kundan
 Kanhaiyalal as Lalaji / Haricharandas
 Manmohan Krishna as Mamaji
 Cuckoo as Dancer

Production
According to author Bunny Reuben, the film was Balraj Sahni's first break in the film industry. Rajendra Kumar was first signed by producer Shah to play the part of Anand, but a few days into the filming was replaced by Sajjan. The film took six months to complete.

Release and reception
The film did well at the box office and, according to Box Office India, was among the ten highest-grossing Indian films of 1951. Its success consolidated Nutan's position as a rising star. The Tribune wrote in a piece about Nutan's career, "Nutan projected the emotions of a tuberculosis patient so realistically that she went on to win laurels." Author Meghnad Desai described it as a "film about the problems faced by a lower middle class family", noting the acting of Nutan and Sahni, and calling it "a conscious criticism of how ordinary people were oppressed in their daily struggle against forces of power and wealth". Bunny Reuben praised it as "a strong, bold and outspoken film".

Author and biographer T. J. S. George wrote, "Zia Sarhadi's Humlog (1951) about the frustrations of the middle class was rendered sensitively by an inspired Balraj Sahni and a convincingly consumptive Nutan."

Hum Log went on to form part of Sarhadi's trilogy of films made in the 1950s, along with Footpath (1953) and Awaaz (1956).

References

Sources

External links

1951 films
1950s Hindi-language films